Mihr 'Ali (Persian: مهر علی نقاش; fl. 1795-post 1830) (also spelt Mir Ali or Mehr Ali) was one of the great royal painters of the Persian court during the reign of Fat'h Ali Shah Qajar, and is regarded as the most notable Persian portraitist of the early part of this reign. Mihr Ali was one of the foremost painters of the early period of Qajar art.

Mihr 'Ali's chief skill was his ability to capture the portrait-sitter's grandeur and power, and as such he became a favourite painter of the Shah. Mihr 'Ali produced at least ten full-size oil paintings of Fat'h Ali Shah, one of the earliest of which was probably sent as a present to the amirs of Sind in 1800. A further portrait, of the Shah enthroned, was sent to Napoleon. Mihr Ali's finest portrait is an 1813–4 work, regarded by some as the finest Persian oil painting in existence. It shows a full-length portrait of the King wearing a gold brocade robe and a royal crown, holding a jewelled staff.

Fat'h Ali Shah commissioned great numbers of lifesize portraits of himself and his sons, works which formed the backdrop to court ceremonies. The works, painted by Mihr 'Ali and his predecessor as court painter, Mirza Baba, portrayed Fat'h Ali Shah in his manyb stately roles, and were intended to show his power as a ruler rather than to be realistic portraits. As a result, the works are heavily stylised, are painted in rich, deep tones, and are filled with symbols of power.

Other important works by Mehr 'Ali include a series of portraits of Persian rulers and figures from the Shahnameh, commissioned by Fat'h Ali Shah as decoration for the 'Imarat-i Naw Palace in Isfahan. This series of works was notable enough to be mentioned in the reports of many of the European travellers to Isfahan, such as James Morier (in A Journey through Persia in the years 1808 and 1809, published in 1812), Sir William Ouseley in 1812 (in Travels into various Countries of the East, published in 1823), and Charles Texier (in Description de l'Arménie, la Perse et la Mesopotamie, published in 1852). Until 1985, it was thought that all of the paintings in this series had been destroyed, but three have since been discovered and authenticated, those being portraits of Afrasiyab, Genghis Khan, and Kay Khusraw, though the Kay Khusraw portrait does not exist in its full form but has been reduced to only some 80% of its original size. Despite this, it sold at auction at Christie's in London in 2007 for £54,000 ($US 107,500). The other two works are also in private hands, having been auctioned by the same company in 1987.

Mihr 'Ali was also a capable teacher, his pupils including the noted painter Abul-Hasan Ghaffari.

References

External links

Painting of Fat'h Ali Shah Qajar by Mihr Ali

Year of death missing
Court painters
18th-century Iranian painters
19th-century Iranian painters
Year of birth uncertain
People of Qajar Iran